The Reihendorf ("row village" or ribbon development, plural: Reihendörfer) or Hufendorf ("oxgang village") is the name used of a particular form of linear settlement in German-speaking countries that is characterized by rows of houses situated along a linear object such as a riverbank, road, valley, or stream.

Description 
Reihendörfer may consist of a one or two rows of houses or farmsteads; the latter being arranged either side of the village street. The farmland associated with each dwelling is adjacent to it, which has the advantage of saving time and reducing the effort involved in transport. The farm can be worked just outside the farmyard or within it e.g. manure can be readily transported from the cowsheds to the fields and the harvest can be easily brought in to the barns. The farmers also have better oversight of their land.

A Reihendorf does not usually have common land.

Types 
Specific forms of Reihendorf include the Straßendorf ("road village"), an elongated village that runs along a road; the Waldhufendorf, typical of forest clearings; the Marschhufendorf, found in marshland; and the Hagenhufendorf, which runs along one side of a river.

References

External links 
 Dickinson, Robert E (1964). Germany: A regional and economic geography (2nd ed.). London: Methuen. .

Rural geography
Settlement geography
Types of village